Bob Sims may refer to:

 Bob Sims (1938–2006), American professional basketball player for the NBA's Los Angeles Lakers and St. Louis Hawks
 Bob Sims (1915–1994), American professional basketball player for the NBL's Tri-Cities Blackhawks and Sheboygan Redskins
 Robert Sims (born 1965), American lyric baritone who specializes in African American folk songs and spirituals